Serhiy Mikolayovych Popko (Ukrainian:Сергій Миколайович Попко) is a Ukrainian military general and a former commander of the Ukrainian Ground Forces (2016-2019). Previously, Popko was the commanding officer of the Ukrainian Anti-Terrorist Operation. He is a graduate of the Kyiv Higher Combined Arms Command School. In 2017, he was promoted to colonel general.

See also 
 Ukrainian Anti-Terrorist Operation
 Ukrainian Ground Forces

References 

1961 births
Living people
Military personnel from Kyiv
Ukrainian generals
Colonel Generals of Ukraine
Ukrainian military personnel of the war in Donbas
Recipients of the Order of Bohdan Khmelnytsky, 2nd class
Recipients of the Order of Bohdan Khmelnytsky, 3rd class